Cardona v. Shinseki was an appeal brought in the United States Court of Appeals for Veterans Claims (CAVC) of a decision by the Board of Veterans' Appeals upholding the denial of service-connected disability benefits for the dependent wife of a female veteran. The United States Department of Veterans Affairs denied the disability benefits based on the definition of "spouse" as "a person of the opposite sex" under federal statute. On March 11, 2014, the CAVC dismissed the case as moot after the Secretary of Veterans Affairs advised the Court that he would neither defend nor enforce the federal statute. Cardona subsequently received full payment of her spousal benefits, retroactive to her date of application.

Proceedings in the Department of Veterans Affairs

Carmen Cardona, a veteran of the United States Navy, applied in 2010 for service-connected disability benefits for her dependent wife.

The Veterans' Affairs Regional Office in Hartford, Connecticut, declined to recognize Cardona's marriage. Title 38 of the United States Code, which relates to veterans' benefits, defines a "spouse" as "a person of the opposite sex who is a wife or husband". The federal regulation that tracks and implements Title 38 defines "spouse" as "a person of the opposite sex" who meets certain requirements.

Cardona appealed the decision to the Board of Veterans' Appeals (BVA), which confirmed the denial of disability benefits based on its conclusion that Cardona's wife is not a "spouse" for purposes of veterans' benefits even though their marriage is valid under Connecticut law. The BVA did not reach the constitutional issues raised by Cardona's legal counsel because it claimed lack of jurisdiction and legal authority.

Appeal to the United States Court of Appeals for Veterans Claims

On October 13, 2011, Cardona, represented by the Jerome N. Frank Legal Services Organization at Yale Law School, filed an appeal in the CAVC against Eric K. Shinseki, the United States Secretary of Veterans Affairs.

Attorney General Eric Holder informed Congress on February 17, 2012, of his conclusion that the definition of "spouse" in Title 38 of the United States Code violates the equal protection component of the Fifth Amendment to the United States Constitution. Holder explained that neither the Department of Defense nor the Department of Veterans Affairs (DVA) had identified any justifications that would warrant treating Title 38 differently from Section 3 of the Defense of Marriage Act (DOMA), which he previously concluded violates equal protection.

On April 19, 2012, Cardona filed a brief with the court, arguing that Title 38 and Section 3 of DOMA are unconstitutional because they violate the Tenth Amendment and the equal protection component of the Fifth Amendment. Cardona also argued that the statutes are unconstitutional bills of attainder.

In a May 4 letter, DVA informed the speaker of the house that it would not defend the denial of benefits to veterans married to same-sex spouses on equal protection grounds. On May 21, the Bipartisan Legal Advisory Group (BLAG) of the U.S. house of representatives filed an unopposed motion to intervene in the case, which the court granted on May 21. and on August 31 filed a brief defending the constitutionality of the statutes.

Oral argument was originally scheduled for November 29, 2012. On November 8, BLAG requested it be postponed for forty-five days, pending the U.S. Supreme Court's disposition of petitions for writs of certiorari in several other cases challenging the constitutionality of Section 3 of DOMA (Massachusetts v. United States Department of Health and Human Services, Gill v. Office of Personnel Management, Golinski v. Office of Personnel Management, Windsor v. United States, and Pedersen v. Office of Personnel Management). The court granted the delay over Cardona's objections. On December 18, 2012, the court, sua sponte, ordered the case "stayed pending resolution of Windsor or until further order of the Court."

On June 26, 2013, the U.S. Supreme Court issued a 5–4 decision in United States v. Windsor declaring Section 3 of DOMA to be unconstitutional "as a deprivation of the liberty of the person protected by the Fifth Amendment." Nine months later, the CAVC dismissed the appeal in Cardona v. Shinseki as moot after the Secretary of Veterans Affairs advised the Court that he would neither defend nor enforce 38 U.S.C. § 101(31). Cardona subsequently received full payment of her spousal benefits, retroactive to her date of application.

Amicus briefs

Six amicus ("friend of the court") briefs were filed in the case, all in support of Cardona.

The Connecticut attorney general argued that the federal statutes and regulations violate the Tenth Amendment to the United States Constitution by intruding on the state's sovereign authority to determine the marital status of its citizens and to guarantee all married couples equal rights and benefits under the law.

Vietnam Veterans of America, Iraq and Afghanistan Veterans of America, Servicemembers Legal Defense Network, Service Women's Action Network, Vets4Vets, and Connecticut Veterans Legal Center argued that the federal statutes and regulations violate the equal protection component of the Fifth Amendment to the United States Constitution. They also argued that the interpretation of them by the Department of Veterans Affairs and the Board of Veterans' Appeals was inconsistent with the intent of Congress.

Briefs were also filed by retired military officers, disability rights advocates, law professors, and 15 public interest and legal services organizations.

See also
Same-sex marriage in Connecticut
Same-sex marriage in the United States
Sexual orientation and the United States military
LGBT rights in Connecticut

Notes

References

External links
 Yale Law School: Briefs and selected motions and orders

2012 in United States case law
Defense of Marriage Act
LGBT rights in Connecticut
United States Court of Appeals for Veterans Claims cases
2011 in Connecticut
2012 in Connecticut
United States same-sex union case law
2014 in LGBT history